Siadabida Manda, or Mada, (born 31 March 1970) is a football player from the Democratic Republic of Congo. He is famous with his excellent physical attributes and temperate character. He was born in Kinshasa.

Manda began playing football in Europe by joining a Belgian club at the age of 22. In 1995, he moved to Greece where he would play for EAR in the Beta Ethniki and Kozani in the Gamma Ethniki before joining Olympiakos Volos. After several seasons with Olympiakos Volou, Manda joined Niki Volos in the Gamma Ethniki during January 2003. He later played in Delta Ethniki sides Aias Tavros and Korinthos, and now plays in the Delta Ethniki with Iraklis Xylokastro.

Personal life 
Manda is married and currently lives in Athens with his wife.

References

1970 births
Living people
Footballers from Kinshasa
Democratic Republic of the Congo footballers
Democratic Republic of the Congo expatriate footballers
Expatriate footballers in Greece
Olympiacos Volos F.C. players
Niki Volos F.C. players
Korinthos F.C. players
Kozani F.C. players
Association football midfielders